Tobias Caulfield (1671-1735) was an Anglican priest in Ireland during the 18th century.

Brocas was born in Galway and educated at Trinity College, Dublin. He was appointed a Prebendary of Achonry in 1696, and of Raphoe in 1716. Caulfield was Archdeacon of Killala  from 1725 until his death a decade later.

Notes

Alumni of Trinity College Dublin
18th-century Irish Anglican priests
1735 deaths
1671 births
Archdeacons of Killala
People from Galway (city)